Deadstream is a 2022 American supernatural horror comedy film directed, written, produced and edited by wife and husband Vanessa and Joseph Winter in their directorial debut, with Joseph also acting as lead actor and soundtrack composer.

The plot follows a disgraced content creator attempting to resurrect his career by livestreaming himself spending the night in a notorious haunted house; the film uses a found footage format, displaying the livestream itself. Deadstream had its world premiere at South by Southwest on March 11, 2022, and was released in the United States on October 6, 2022, by Shudder to positive reviews.

Plot
The film centers on Shawn, a disgraced YouTube personality known for videos featuring him performing stunts to "overcome his fears." Prior to the start of the film, one of Shawn's videos resulted in a serious controversy that lost him his sponsors and much of his fanbase. Desperate to regain his popularity and retain his new sole sponsor, Shawn plans to livestream himself spending the night in Death Manor, a purportedly haunted house where several people have died.

As part of the deal with the sponsor, if Shawn leaves or doesn't fully explore the house, he forfeits the sponsorship. Throughout the stream Shawn periodically opens the chat screen to react to his viewers' comments. As the livestream begins, Shawn throws his car's sparkplugs into the woods, then locks the door behind him and throws the key down a grate. While setting up his cameras, he narrates Death Manor's history: It is haunted by the ghost of Mildred Pratt, a wealthy Mormon heiress and failed poet, who died by suicide after her publisher and paramour's sudden death. Subsequent occupants of the house died mysteriously and the place was eventually abandoned. Shawn speculates that the various deaths over the years were Mildred trying to build a family she was unable to have in life. Shawn tours the house and introduces each room, including one with no history of paranormal activity. He declares it the safe room and sets up his equipment there. He discovers a strange symbol hanging in a closet, removes it and later destroys it in a panic.

Afterwards, Shawn attempts to provoke the spirits via a séance. After experiencing some strange noises, he fearfully shuts himself up in his room. It turns out to be Chrissy, a super fan who has traveled to Death Manor to meet him. Shawn, reluctant to share his spotlight, begrudgingly allows her stay to please his viewers. They investigate more of the house, finding Mildred's poetry book, which Shawn dismisses as mediocre as it "doesn't even rhyme". As the two attempt to speak to the spirit of Mildred through a spirit board, Chrissy convinces Shawn to recite a Latin phase to put the ghosts to rest.

Chrissy's behavior annoys and worries Shawn, who tells her to leave. She attacks him, biting his neck. In self defense he stabs her in the neck. Believing he's killed her, Shawn intends to leave and turn himself in, but finds her body gone. Shawn searches the grate he had thrown his key down, but only finds the key to a box containing a severed finger and a picture revealing that Chrissy is actually Mildred Pratt. Knowledgeable viewers discover that the symbol he destroyed earlier was a hamsa meant to protect against evil. Also, the Latin phrase he recited was a soul offering that Mildred had used to bind the souls of the previous occupants to herself. After being terrorized by the grotesque ghouls of the previous occupants, Shawn made several attempts to flee the house and eventually jumps out the second floor window.

Shawn finds the spark plugs, but comes across more ghouls. After fighting one off with a potato gun, his iPad is damaged. Cut off from his viewers and resigned to his fate, Shawn takes shelter in his car and reads from Mildred's book of poetry. He discovers the incantation that Mildred used to gain her satanic powers, and the phrase repeated by the ghostly voices is actually in one of the poems. Putting the pieces together, he realizes Mildred never wanted a family, but an audience for her poetry. He becomes inspired to complete the ritual to circumvent her power through his own audience and send her back to hell. 

Shawn arms himself, returns to the house to challenge Mildred. Fighting his way back to the saferoom, he retrieves a spare iPad and reads the comments that translate the incantation. While setting up the ritual, Shawn awkwardly apologizes for his insensitive stunts, racism, and poor apology, vowing to be better.

After a grueling fight with Mildred, Shawn gets the upper hand and reads the incantation, which didn't work. Spotting her severed finger, he remembers the ritual requires a "sacrifice of flesh". He cuts off one of his fingers, which completes the ritual Mildred is dragged into the blood filled basement by unseen forces. Shawn celebrates, thanking his now massive viewer count for helping him survive the night. However, as he exits, he is surrounded by Mildred's surviving ghoul audience and his livestream cuts out.

Cast
 Joseph Winter as Shawn
 Melanie Stone as Chrissy / Mildred

Release
Deadstream premiered at the South by Southwest Film Festival on March 11, 2022, and was released on the streaming service Shudder as one of its original films on October 6, 2022.

Reception
On review aggregator website Rotten Tomatoes, the film has an approval rating of 91% based on 53 reviews, with an average rating of 7.4/10. The website's critics consensus reads: "Proof that there's still life in the found-footage gimmick, Deadstream is a scarily good bit of B-movie fun." On Metacritic, the film has a weighted average score of 67 out of 100, based on 10 critics, indicating "generally favorable reviews."

References

External links
 

2022 comedy horror films
Found footage films
American comedy horror films
Shudder (streaming service) original programming
Haunted house films
Screenlife films
Techno-horror films
Films about social media